Stefan Hristov may refer to:

 Stefan Hristov (footballer) (born 1989), Bulgarian footballer
 Stefan Hristov (cyclist) (born 1985), Bulgarian cyclist